WFGI may refer to:

 WFGI-FM, a radio station (95.5 FM) licensed to Johnstown, Pennsylvania, United States
 WFGI (AM), a radio station (940 AM) licensed to Charleroi, Pennsylvania, United States